Souls in Bondage is a lost 1916 silent film drama directed by Edgar Lewis and produced by the Lubin Manufacturing Company. Nance O'Neil stars.

Cast
Nance O'Neil - Rosa Brenner
Mary Carr - Mrs. Coombes (*as Mrs. Carr)
William Corbett - Julian Forbes
Bernard Siegel - Mr. Brenner
Ida Stanhope - Rita Brenner
Mrs. Stuart - Mrs. Forbes

References

External links
 Souls in Bondage at IMDb.com

1916 films
American silent feature films
Lubin Manufacturing Company films
Lost American films
American black-and-white films
Silent American drama films
1916 drama films
1916 lost films
Lost drama films
Films directed by Edgar Lewis
1910s American films